The 2000 PBA Commissioner's Cup Finals was the best-of-7 championship series of the 2000 PBA Commissioner's Cup and the conclusion of the conference's playoffs. The San Miguel Beermen and Sta. Lucia Realtors played for the 76th championship contested by the league.

San Miguel Beermen claim their 14th PBA crown, surpassing the age-old record of the famed Crispa Redmanizers' 13 titles by winning against Sta. Lucia in five games. The Realtors were on their first finals appearance since joining the league in 1993.

Danny Ildefonso won on his second Back To Back Finals MVP in Commissioners Cup Finals.

Series scoring summary

Games summary

Game 1

The beermen limited Sta.Lucia import Ansu Sesay to just 3 points in the second period to build a 44-33 halftime advantage. In the third quarter, San Miguel continued the assault to post a 75-50 lead.

Game 2

Danny Ildefonso muscled his way to 18 points and 10 rebounds and outplayed Marlou Aquino at the paint before Danny Seigle converted on a trey that gave the beermen a 67-61 spread.

Game 3

Danny Seigle scored six of the beermen's last nine points, hitting two clutch baskets to lift San Miguel past Sta.Lucia, with Stephen Howard trapped on a double team down low. The beermen were forced to rotate the ball which eventually ended in Seigle's hot hands. Seigle drilled a triple that gave the beermen an 83-82 edge with 1:46 left, a minute later, Seigle drive through the realtors' defense for an 87-83 lead with 21.2 seconds remaining.

Game 4

Dennis Espino and Paolo Mendoza took charge in the final quarter with import Ansu Sesay unable to elude the beermen's sticky defense. The realtors limited the beermen to just eight points in the fourth period.

Game 5

Danny Ildefonso and Danny Seigle delivered the killing blows on the realtors, scoring a lay-in and a three-pointer in the closing seconds in a nail-biting victory. Rookie Paolo Mendoza of Sta.Lucia, who kept his team within striking distance in the third period with his fiery outside shooting, pegged the final score with a triple. Danny Ildefonso won his second back to back Finals MVP and San Miguel captures win on 2 peat back to back champs 13th title.

Roster

Broadcast notes

References

External links
PBA official website

2000 PBA season
2000
San Miguel Beermen games
Sta. Lucia Realtors games
PBA Commissioner's Cup Finals